Ilir Qorri (born 7 November 1975) is an Albanian retired football player who started his career as a defender but also played as a striker for a number of Albanian Superliga sides including KF Elbasani and Dinamo Tirana.

Honours

Club
Dinamo Tirana
 Albanian Superliga (1): 2001–02
 Albanian Cup (1): 2002–03

KF Elbasani
 Albanian Superliga (1): 2005–06

References

1975 births
Living people
Footballers from Elbasan
Albanian footballers
Association football defenders
Association football forwards
KF Elbasani players
KF Bylis Ballsh players
FK Dinamo Tirana players
Khazar Lankaran FK players
KS Shkumbini Peqin players
KF Teuta Durrës players
Kategoria Superiore players
Albanian expatriate footballers
Expatriate footballers in Azerbaijan
Albanian expatriate sportspeople in Azerbaijan